The oceanic basslets are ray-finned fish that belong to the small family Howellidae within the superfamily Percoidea of the suborder Percoidei part of the order Perciformes. The family includes about 9 species. They are mostly deep-water species, some of which move to shallower waters at night. Various species are found in the Indian Ocean, Pacific Ocean, including the Coral Sea, and Atlantic Ocean, including the Caribbean Sea.

Genera
The following three genera are classified as part of the Howellidae:

 Bathysphyraenops Parr, 1933
 Howella Ogilby, 1899
 Pseudohowella Fedoryako,  1976

References

Further reading
Prokofiev, A. M. (2007). The osteology of Bathysphyraenops symplex and the diagnosis of the Howellidae (Perciformes: Percoidei) family. Journal of Ichthyology 47(8), 566–578.

Percoidea
Taxa named by James Douglas Ogilby